Mike Leeder (born 5 August 1968, in Croydon, England) is an English casting director, producer and actor based in Hong Kong. Leeder has been responsible for DVD and Blu-ray special features for many Hong Kong productions. He worked on such projects as Fearless (2006), The Raid 2 (2014), The Man with the Iron Fists (2012), Man of Tai Chi (2013), Ultimate Justice (2016), Rogue One: A Star Wars Story (2016), Chasing the Dragon (2017) and Donnie Yen's Big Brother (2018).

Career

Critic 
Since arriving in Hong Kong, Leeder has written extensively on the subject of Hong Kong, Asian and International action and martial arts cinema, and is an acknowledged expert in the subject. He has reviewed many productions and conducted interviews with actors, directors and choreographers including Jackie Chan, Jean-Claude Van Damme, Sammo Hung, Jet Li, Donnie Yen, Ronny Yu, Yuen Woo-ping, Scott Adkins, Isaac Florentine, Tony Jaa and Gareth Evans for publications such as South China Morning Post, Combat, Budo International, Karate Illustrated, Femme Fatales, Inside Karate, Inside Kung Fu, Black Belt magazine, Blitz International, Time Out Beijing, BC magazine, Hong Kong Magazine, Eastern Heroes, Screen Power, Jade Screen and Impact magazine, for which Leeder served as a contributor since the first issue and as Far East Editor from 2000-2017. Leeder helped create special features for numerous DVD/Blu-ray releases for such companies as 88 Films, Eureka Entertainment, TVP-The Vengeance Pack, Hong Kong Legends, Premier Asia, Media Blasters, BCI, Dragon Dynasty, Shout Factory and Germany's TVP-The Vengeance Pack, conducting interviews and recording audio commentaries.

Content production 
Leeder has worked in Asia and internationally as a casting director and consultant, projects such  as Rogue One: A Star Wars Story, Jet Li's Fearless, Jackie Chan's Rush Hour 3 and CZ 12: Chinese Zodiac, RZA's The Man with the Iron Fists part 1 & 2, Keanau Reeves directorial debut Man of Tai Chi, various projects for HBOAsia including Serangoon Road & Grace, the Resident Evil franchise, the Ip Man series, Donnie Yen's Chasing the Dragon & Big Brother, Blood the Last Vampire, Yuen Woo-ping's True Legend, the black comedy Stegman is Dead, the BBC's ill-fated Phoo Action, and martial arts adventure Triple Threat.

Leeder's credits as a stunt liaison include The Mummy: Tomb of the Dragon Emperor working with Vic Armstrong, The Raid 2 working with Gareth Evans and Bruce Law Stunts Unlimited, Pound of Flesh, Abduction and Ultimate Justice.

As a producer, Leeder's credits include indie action movies The Silencer, Ten Dead Men, George Clarke's killer clown thriller Splash Area, Ross Clarkson's psychological thriller Captured, Albert Pyun's Interstellar Civil War, the Australian TV series Tiger Cops, Ernie Barbarash's Pound of Flesh starring Jean-Claude Van Damme and Abduction starring Scott Adkins & Andy On, Noriko the Hong Kong Dead, 12/Underground starring Mark Strange and The Bodyguard: A New Beginning as well as the upcoming documentary Neon Grindhouse: Hong Kong.

Leeder refers to himself as an occasional actor, having played minor roles in such projects as Once Upon a Time in China 1 & 2, Jackie Chan's City Hunger, the Sad Story of Saigon, and larger supporting roles in such projects as Fearless, Helios, Ultimate Justice, The Path to the Dream, Nightfall, Mission Milano, Chasing the Dragon, Big Brother, HBO Asia's Sent, Pound of Flesh & Abduction.

Leeder was one of the founding partners in the Hong Kong/German independent production company Silent Partners, producing indie action movies One Million K'licks starring German martial arts sensation Mike Moeller, and the dark thriller Ultimate Justice starring Mark Dacascos, Matthias Hues and Mike Moeller. Leeder left the company in 2017, citing ongoing creative differences with his co-founder over the direction the company was heading, and that the way Ultimate Justice was altered in post-production did not match the original vision or plan for the movie.

Leeder was the co-founder of Silent Partners, the production company responsible for One Million Klicks and Ultimate Justice. Leeder left the company in 2017, citing ongoing creative differencea with his co-founder over company direction.

Leeder's most recent projects include Ip Man 4: The Finale, Raging Fire, Echo 8, Lockdown and the romantic comedy Hong Kong Love Story.

References

External links

Living people
1968 births